Season 1997–98 was the 114th football season in which Dumbarton competed at a Scottish national level, entering the Scottish Football League for the 92nd time, the Scottish Cup for the 103rd time, the Scottish League Cup for the 51st time and the Scottish Challenge Cup for the eighth time.

Overview 
In Ian Wallace's first full season at the helm, Dumbarton's poor financial status meant that the team was almost unchanged from the one that had dropped from the Second Division the previous season.  Nevertheless, initial results were promising, but this was soon to be replaced with that well known sinking feeling as the season went on.  From January, Dumbarton registered just 3 league wins, and from the end of February till the end of the season propped up the rest of the league - easily Dumbarton's worst league performance in its history.

In the national cup competitions, however, the five-year wait for some progress was brought to an end. In the Scottish Cup, an uninspiring win over Highland League outfit Lossiemouth presented Dumbarton with a tie against Premier Division Motherwell in the third round.  After holding their opponents to a home draw, they battled fiercely in the replay only to lose by a single goal.

In the League Cup, old rivals Queen's Park were dispatched in the first round, before Dumbarton found Premier Division Aberdeen too hot to handle.

Finally, however, in the Challenge Cup, it was the same old story - eight seasons and eight first round defeats - Falkirk would be the victors this time.

Locally, in the Stirlingshire Cup, the format reverted to group ties, but with only one win from three ties, Dumbarton failed to reach the final.

Results & fixtures

Scottish Third Division

Coca-Cola Cup

Scottish Challenge Cup

Tennent's Scottish Cup

Stirlingshire Cup

Pre-season/Other Matches

League table

Player statistics

Squad 

|}

Transfers

Players in

Players out

Trivia
 The League Cup match against Queen's Park on 2 August marked Hugh Ward's 100th appearance for Dumbarton in all national competitions - the 111th Dumbarton player to reach this milestone.
 The League match against East Stirling on 20 December marked Martin Mooney's 200th appearance for Dumbarton in all national competitions - the 27th Dumbarton player to break the 'double century'.
 For the third successive season Dumbarton matched the record fewest league home wins during a season - just two!

See also
 1997–98 in Scottish football

References

External links
Derek Barnes (Dumbarton Football Club Historical Archive)
Chris Dalrymple (Dumbarton Football Club Historical Archive)
Billy Davidson (Dumbarton Football Club Historical Archive)
Stephen Hamill (Dumbarton Football Club Historical Archive)
David Reid (Dumbarton Football Club Historical Archive)
Adrian Mellis (Dumbarton Football Club Historical Archive)
Chris Ewing (Dumbarton Football Club Historical Archive)
Marc Falconer (Dumbarton Football Club Historical Archive)
Hrienn Hringsson (Dumbarton Football Club Historical Archive)
Ross McCuaig (Dumbarton Football Club Historical Archive)
Tommi Orismaa (Dumbarton Football Club Historical Archive)
Scottish Football Historical Archive

Dumbarton F.C. seasons
Scottish football clubs 1997–98 season